Alex Webb may refer to:

 Alex Webb (musician) (born 1961), British songwriter, musician and former journalist
 Alex Webb (photographer) (born 1952), American photojournalist

See also
Alexander Webb (disambiguation)